Picrolemma is a genus of flowering plants belonging to the family Simaroubaceae. They are small dioecious shrubs.

Its native range is Southern Tropical America.

Species:

Picrolemma huberi 
Picrolemma sprucei

References

Simaroubaceae
Sapindales genera
Dioecious plants